Julius Meinl may refer to:
The Julius Meinl group, operator of supermarkets and cafés
Julius Meinl I, founder of the company
Julius Meinl V

Meinl, Julius